Elaeocarpus largiflorens, commonly known as tropical quandong, is a species of flowering plant in the family Elaeocarpaceae and is endemic to Queensland. It is a medium-sized to large tree, sometimes with buttress roots at the base of the trunk, mostly elliptic leaves and reddish-brown flowers.

Description
Its young leaves and shoots are densely covered with short, reddish-brown hairs. The flowers are densely covered with reddish-brown hairs. Between sixty and seventy stamens  are crowded around and obscuring the ovary.

Taxonomy
Elaeocarpus largiflorens was first formally described in 1933 by Cyril Tenison White in Contributions from the Arnold Arboretum of Harvard University from material he collected near Malanda in 1923.

In 1984, Mark James Elgar Coode described two subspecies in the journal Kew Bulletin and the names are accepted by the Australian Plant Census:
 Elaeocarpus largiflorens C.T.White subsp. largiflorens has its main leaf veins in an even curve;
 Elaeocarpus largiflorens subsp. retinervis B.Hyland & Coode has zig-zagged main leaf veins.

Distribution and habitat
Subspecies retinervis is restricted to the Mount Spurgeon - Mount Lewis area.

Conservation status
Both subspecies of E. largiflorens are listed as of "least concern" under the Queensland Government Nature Conservation Act 1992.

References

largiflorens
Oxalidales of Australia
Flora of Queensland
Plants described in 1933
Endemic flora of Australia
Taxa named by Cyril Tenison White